Çovdar or Chovdar may refer to:
Çovdar, Dashkasan, Azerbaijan
Çovdar, Kalbajar, Azerbaijan